Michael Laffey was a member of the Wisconsin State Assembly.

Biography
Laffey was born on June 5, 1863 in Clyman, Wisconsin. He would eventually become involved in real estate.

Political career
Laffey was elected to the Assembly in 1922 and was re-elected in 1924, 1926 and 1928. Previously, he was a member of the Milwaukee, Wisconsin Common Council from 1896 to 1897. He was a Republican.

References

People from Dodge County, Wisconsin
Politicians from Milwaukee
Businesspeople from Wisconsin
Republican Party members of the Wisconsin State Assembly
Wisconsin city council members
1863 births
Year of death missing